Meliola evansii is a fungus in the family Meliolaceae. It has been seen in Mozambique, South Africa, and the Cook Islands. It has been recorded to be hosted by Maytenus acuminata.

References

Meliolaceae